Jonas Meffert (born 4 September 1994) is a German professional footballer who plays as a defensive midfielder for 2. Bundesliga club Hamburger SV.

Career
On 6 May 2014, he signed a three-year contract with Karlsruher SC.

On 31 May 2016, he signed for SC Freiburg.

In July 2018, Meffert joined 2. Bundesliga side Holstein Kiel signing a three-year contract until 2021.

Career statistics

1.Includes German Cup.
2.Includes UEFA Europa League.
3.Includes Promotion/relegation playoff.

References

External links
 
 
 

1994 births
Living people
Association football midfielders
German footballers
Germany youth international footballers
Bayer 04 Leverkusen II players
Bayer 04 Leverkusen players
Karlsruher SC players
SC Freiburg players
Holstein Kiel players
Hamburger SV players
Bundesliga players
2. Bundesliga players
Footballers from Cologne